The Huff-Daland LB-1 was an American biplane light bomber aircraft operated by the United States Army Air Service in the 1920s.

Derived from the XLB-1 prototype bought by the Army in 1923, the LB-1 development aircraft was powered by a single Packard 2A-2500 engine and carried an extra crewman. It proved underpowered in service trials, and was replaced by the twin-engined XLB-3.

Variants
XLB-1 Prototype aircraft, powered by an 800-hp (597-kW) Packard 1A-2500 piston engine; one built (S/N 23-1250).
LB-1 Single-engine light bomber biplane, powered by an 800-hp (597-kW) Packard 2A-2500 piston engine; nine built (S/N 26-377/385).

Operators

United States Army Air Service
11th Bomb Squadron

Specifications

See also

References

Notes

Bibliography

 Donald, David, ed. Encyclopedia of World Aircraft. Etobicoke, ON: Prospero Books, 1997. .
 Swanborough, F.G. and Peter M. Bowers. United States Military Aircraft since 1909. London: Putnam, 1963.
 Huff Daland LB-1 – National Museum of the United States Air Force

Biplanes
LB-01
Light bombers
Single-engined tractor aircraft
Huff-Daland LB-01